Richard Lynch Garner (February 19, 1848 – January 22, 1920) was an American researcher who studied the language of primates, especially chimpanzees, and pioneered the use of playback devices in this kind of research. His theories and findings have been superseded by more recent research, but his work has been an inspiration to such notable scientists as Robert Yerkes and John Peabody Harrington.

Education
Richard Lynch Garner was born in Abingdon, Virginia on February 19, 1848, the son of a businessman. He joined the Confederate Army at the age of 14, and during the Civil War was captured several times by Union soldiers. After the war, he attended the Jefferson Academy for Men in Tennessee for two years before becoming a schoolteacher, a vocation he pursued for over a decade.

He married Maggie E. Gross on October 15, 1872, and they had one son.

Career

Garner's career studying primates arose through his interest in Charles Darwin and the theory of evolution. He hypothesized that human speech might have arisen from animal sounds and "resolved to study those sounds in a methodic manner and try to learn the speech of animals." He acquired one of Thomas Edison's early phonographs and began to spend time observing and recording monkeys at zoos in Cincinnati, Chicago, Washington, D.C., and elsewhere. He became famous for an 1891 article, "The Simian Tongue", in which he argued that the lower primates have a rudimentary language, and that this language is the origin of human speech.

In 1896 Garner went to Africa to study gorillas, then considered as aggressive. He lived and observed from inside a cage, a few gorillas came near and none showed any aggression. Garner next raised funds for a trip to study chimpanzees in Gabon; among his donors were such prominent figures as Edison, Alexander Melville Bell, and Grover Cleveland. In Gabon, he attempted to decipher individual words of the chimpanzee language, and he also attempted to teach one chimpanzee a few words. He returned to Africa on several more research trips, some lasting more than a year. In 1910, he brought a chimpanzee named Susie back to the United States and toured with her, attempting to demonstrate that she knew a hundred English words.

Garner published three books on the subject of speech in primates, as well as articles in various magazines.

Garner was hospitalized with Bright's disease in Chattanooga, Tennessee, and died several days later, on January 22, 1920.

Publications
 The Speech of Monkeys (1892)
 Gorillas & Chimpanzees (1896)
 Apes and Monkeys: Their Life and Language (1900)
 Autobiography of a Boy: From the Letters of Richard Lynch Garner (1930; posthumous)

Legacy
Early on, publications that did not reject evolutionary theory outright tended to accept Garner's various claims about chimpanzees — that he could communicate with them in their language, that he had taught them English words, that within a few generations they would be entirely literate — but in later years more skeptical and even satirical articles began to appear. Little of Garner's work has held up to scientific scrutiny, both because of his inflated claims and because he was a notoriously sloppy researcher who made many plainly incorrect statements about chimpanzee behavior (such as his assertion that their gestation period is 3 months when it is closer to 8 months). At the same time, he was ahead of his time in his pioneering use of  recording devices for capturing field data and for use in playback-based experiments. And while he himself was not able to make a sound case for his intuitions about monkey speech, it has since been proven that monkeys do have a rudimentary language of their own, and that they can learn a vocabulary of a few hundred human words. As the primatologist Robert Yerkes later wrote: "The  writer humbly confesses that the more he learns about the great apes and lesser primates by direct observation as contrasted with reading, the more facts and valuable suggestions he discovers in Garner's writings."

The ethnologist John Peabody Harrington considered Garner an inspiration and wrote a brief biography of Garner entitled He Spoke. Harrington also helped get Garner's papers and slides donated to the Smithsonian Institution.

References

Further reading
 Harvey, Neil. "The Man Who Talked to Monkeys". The Roanoke Times, 2004.
 Radick, Gregory. "Morgan's Canon, Garner's Phonograph, and the Evolutionary Origins of Language and Reason". Journal of the History of the Behavioral Sciences 33:1 (2000): 3-23.
 Rich, Jeremy. Missing Links: The African and American Worlds of R. L. Garner, Primate Collector. University of Georgia Press, 2012.

External links
 "Register to the Papers of Richard Lynch Garner at the Smithsonian Institution
 

1848 births
1920 deaths
Primatologists
People from Abingdon, Virginia
Confederate States Army soldiers
People of Virginia in the American Civil War
Deaths from nephritis